ASF Fianarantsoa is a Malagasy football club based in Madagascar who currently plays in the Malagasy Second Division.

In 1990 the club has won the THB Champions League.

Achievements
THB Champions League: 1
 1990

Performance in CAF competitions
 African Cup of Champions Clubs: 1 appearance
1991 African Cup of Champions Clubs:

References

External links

Fianarantsoa